The 51st edition of the Femina Miss India beauty pageant was held on April 5, 2014 in Mumbai, India. Finalists had been selected in a previous round held in Bangalore in January 2014, with 24 women competing for the title of Miss India World. Koyal Rana from Delhi was crowned Femina Miss India 2014 by the previous year's winner Navneet Kaur Dhillon, while Jhataleka Malhotra and Gail Nicole Da Silva were crowned 1st and 2nd Runners Up respectively.

Koyal Rana represented India at Miss World 2014 held in the United Kingdom where she was declared Miss World Asia and placed in the top 11. Jhataleka Malhotra represented India at Miss International held in Japan where she won the Miss Internet Beauty award. Gail Nicole Da Silva represented India at Miss United Continent 2014 held in Ecuador where she was crowned 1st Runner Up and also won the Miss Photogenic and Best National Costume awards.

After the Femina Miss India 2014 pageant, Ruhi Singh, who was not a contestant at Femina Miss India 2014 but had been a contestant in the 2012 edition, was later designated by Femina as India's representative at Miss Universal Peace and Humanity 2014 held in Lebanon where she was crowned the first ever winner of the pageant.

Final Results
Color keys

Special awards

Finale Judges
 Abhay Deol - Bollywood Actor
 Aditi Rao Hydari - Model and Bollywood Actress
 Jacqueline Fernandez - Miss Universe Sri Lanka 2006, model and Bollywood actress
 Malaika Arora - Actress, model, VJ and television presenter
 Manish Malhotra - Fashion designer
 Megan Young - Miss World 2013 from Philippines
 Vidyut Jamwal - Model and actor
 Vijender Singh - Indian Olympic Boxer
 Yo Yo Honey Singh - Singer and Rapper

Contestants
24 contestants were selected from all over the country to compete in the main event.

References

2014
2014 beauty pageants
2014 in India